The 2019–20 PFF Women's League season is the third season of the women's national league of the Philippines following the 2018 season.

De La Salle University is the defending champions.

Format
The league adopted a double round-robin format with a projected 90 matches to be played from July 27, 2019. The primary venue for the league's matches is the PFF National Training Centre in Carmona, Cavite. Matches will be usually held in the weekends with select matches to be held during the weekdays. The league's first round ran until mid-October 2019 with the second round beginning on October 19, 2019.

Though initially planned to last until December 2019, the league season's duration was extended to the following year with the first matches of 2020 to be held on January 11, 2020. The season ended in February 2020.

Clubs
10 teams participated in the third season of the league with Maroons FC, Nomads FC, and Tigers FC. making their debuts. 2018 season participants, Ateneo de Manila University, De La Salle Zobel and OutKast decided not to enter for this season while Hiraya had a merger with Stallion to form Hiraya-Stallion F.C..

Venues

The following football venues has hosted league matches:
De La Salle Canlubang Football Field, Biñan
Moro Lorenzo Football Field, Quezon City
UP Diliman Football Field, Quezon City
PFF National Training Centre, Carmona

League table

Results

First round

Second round

Honors
Individual award
Most Valuable Player:  Anna Delos Reyes (De La Salle)
Best Goalkeeper:  Kimberly Pariña (FEU)
Best Defender:  Glyness Dela Cruz  (De La Salle)
Best Midfielder:  Shelah Mae Cadag (UST)
Golden Boot:  Isabella Bandoja (Tuloy) with 30 goals

Team
Fair Play Award: Nomads

References

2019-2020 PFF Women's League
Philippines
PFF Women's League seasons
PFF Women's League
2019-2020 PFF Women's League